Chelodina gunaleni or Gunalen's snake-necked turtle is a turtle species in the family Chelidae. The species is endemic to the lowlands of west-central West Papua, Indonesia, south of the central ranges.

References

External links

Chelodina
Reptiles described in 2007
Turtles of New Guinea
Endemic fauna of New Guinea